Lee J. Cobb (born Leo Jacoby; December 8, 1911February 11, 1976) was an American actor, known both for film roles and his work on the Broadway stage, as well as for his television role as the star of the TV series The Virginian. He often played arrogant, intimidating and abrasive characters, but he also acted as respectable figures such as judges and police officers. Cobb originated the role of Willy Loman in Arthur Miller's 1949 play Death of a Salesman under the direction of Elia Kazan, and was twice nominated for the Academy Award for Best Supporting Actor, for On the Waterfront (1954) and The Brothers Karamazov (1958). 

His film performances included Juror #3 in 12 Angry Men (1957), Dock Tobin in Man of the West (1958), Barak Ben Canaan in Exodus (1960), Marshall Lou Ramsey in How the West Was Won (1962), Cramden in Our Man Flint (1966), and Lt. William Kinderman in The Exorcist (1973).

On television, Cobb starred in the Western series The Virginian as Judge Henry Garth and the ABC legal drama The Young Lawyers as David Barrett, and nominated for an Outstanding Single Performance by an Actor Emmy Award three separate times. In 1981, Cobb was posthumously inducted into the American Theatre Hall of Fame.

Early life and education
Cobb was born in New York City, to a Jewish family of Russian and Romanian origin. He grew up in the Bronx, New York, on Wilkins Avenue, near Crotona Park. His parents were Benjamin (Benzion) Jacob, a compositor for a foreign-language newspaper, and Kate (Neilecht).

Interested in acting from a young age, Cobb ran away from home at 16 to try and make it in Hollywood. He joined Borrah Minevitch's Harmonica Rascals as a musician and had a bit part in a short film featuring the group, but failed to find steady work and eventually moved back to New York.

Cobb studied accounting at New York University while working as a radio salesman. Still interested in showbusiness, he went back to California and studied acting at the Pasadena Playhouse. He finally made his film debut at 23 in two episodes of the film serial The Vanishing Shadow (1934). He joined the Manhattan-based Group Theatre in 1935.

Career

Stage 
Cobb performed summer stock with the Group Theatre in 1936, when it summered at Pine Brook Country Club in Nichols, Connecticut. He made his Broadway debut as a saloonkeeper in a dramatization of Crime and Punishment that closed after 15 nights. He starred opposite Elia Kazan in Group Theatre's productions of Clifford Odets' Waiting for Lefty and Golden Boy. He also acted in Ernest Hemingway's only ever full-length play, The Fifth Column, and Clash by Night.

Cobb gained widespread recognition for his portrayal of Willy Loman in the original production of Arthur Miller's play Death of a Salesman under the direction of Elia Kazan. Miller praised Cobb as "the greatest dramatic actor I ever saw" and, upon his casting, changed a line referring to the physical appearance of the title character, whom the author had originally conceived of as a small man, from "shrimp" to "walrus". Cobb played through the play's entire initial run at the Morosco Theatre between February 1949 and November 1950. The play won the Tony Award for Best Play and the Pulitzer Prize for Drama. Miller later offered Cobb the part of Eddie Carbone in A View from the Bridge, but Cobb turned it down.

During World War II, Cobb joined the US Army Air Forces in the hopes of becoming a pilot. Instead, he was assigned to a radio unit. He was later transferred to the First Motion Picture Unit, where he appeared in Moss Hart Army Emergency Relief fundraiser productions like This is the Army and Winged Victory.

In 1968, his performance as King Lear with Stacy Keach as Edmund, René Auberjonois as the Fool, and Philip Bosco as Kent achieved the longest run (72 performances) for the play in Broadway history.

Film 

Cobb entered films in the 1930s, successfully playing middle-aged and even older characters while he was still a youth. His first credited role was in the 1937 Hopalong Cassidy oater Rustlers' Valley, where he was billed using the stage name 'Lee Colt.' In all subsequent films, he used Lee Cobb and later Lee J. Cobb.

He starred in the 1939 film adaptation of Golden Boy, albeit in a different role.

He was cast as the Kralahome in the 1946 film Anna and the King of Siam, upon which the musical play The King and I was later partially based. He also played the sympathetic doctor in The Song of Bernadette and appeared as Derek Flint's (James Coburn) supervisor in the James Bond spy spoofs Our Man Flint and In Like Flint. 

In August 1955, while filming The Houston Story, Cobb suffered a heart attack and was replaced by Gene Barry. Later that year, he picked up a Best Supporting Actor Oscar nomination for his portrayal of corrupt union boss Johnny Friendly in Elia Kazan’s On the Waterfront. He was nominated a second time for playing Fyodor in Richard Brooks’ movie adaptation of The Brothers Karamazov.

In 1957, he appeared in Sidney Lumet's 12 Angry Men as the abrasive Juror #3. The role earned him a Golden Globe nomination for Best Supporting Actor, one of two in the same category. He was nominated again for the Frank Sinatra comedy Come Blow Your Horn (1963).

One of his final film roles was that of Washington, D.C. Metropolitan Police homicide detective Lt. Kinderman in the 1973 horror film The Exorcist, about a demonic possession of a teen-age girl (Linda Blair) in Georgetown, D. C.  In the same decade, Cobb travelled to Europe to work in Italian films, primarily poliziotteschi (crime thrillers). His final films, Cross Shot and Nick the Sting, were both released posthumously, nearly two months after Cobb died.

Television 
In 1959, on CBS' DuPont Show of the Month, he starred in the dual roles of Miguel de Cervantes and Don Quixote in the play I, Don Quixote, which years later became the musical Man of La Mancha. Cobb also appeared as the Medicine Bow, Wyoming owner of the Shiloh Ranch, Judge Henry Garth in the first four seasons (1962–1966), of the long-running NBC Western television series The Virginian (1962–1971).

He reprised his role of Willy Loman in the 1966 CBS television adaptation of the famous play Death of a Salesman, which included Gene Wilder, James Farentino, Bernie Kopell, and George Segal. Cobb was nominated for an Emmy Award for the performance. Mildred Dunnock, who had co-starred in both the original stage version and the 1951 film version, again repeated her role as Linda, Willy's devoted wife.

One of his last television roles was as a stalwart overworked elderly physician still making house calls in urban Baltimore, in Doctor Max, a TV pilot for a potential series that never materialized. His final aired television role was Origins of the Mafia, a miniseries about the history of the Sicilian Mafia, filmed on-location in Italy. He subsequently appeared alongside British actor Kenneth Griffith in an ABC television documentary on the American Revolution called Suddenly an Eagle, which was broadcast six months after his death.

Political activity
Cobb was accused of being a Communist in 1951 testimony before the House Un-American Activities Committee (HUAC) of the U.S. House of Representatives of the Congress by Larry Parks, himself an admitted former Communist Party member. Cobb was called to testify before HUAC but refused to do so for two years until his career was threatened by the blacklist. He relented in 1953 and gave testimony, naming 20 people as former members of the Communist Party USA.

Later, Cobb explained why he "named names", saying:

When the facilities of the government of the United States are drawn on an individual it can be terrifying. The blacklist is just the opening gambit—being deprived of work. Your passport is confiscated. That's minor. But not being able to move without being tailed is something else. After a certain point it grows to implied as well as articulated threats, and people succumb. My wife did, and she was institutionalized. The HUAC did a deal with me. I was pretty much worn down. I had no money. I couldn't borrow. I had the expenses of taking care of the children. Why am I subjecting my loved ones to this? If it's worth dying for, and I am just as idealistic as the next fellow. But I decided it wasn't worth dying for, and if this gesture was the way of getting out of the penitentiary I'd do it. I had to be employable again.

— Interview with Victor Navasky for the 1980 book Naming Names

Following the hearing, he resumed his career and worked with Elia Kazan and Budd Schulberg, two other HUAC "friendly witnesses", on the 1954 film On the Waterfront.

Personal life
Cobb married Yiddish theatre and film actress Helen Beverley in 1940. They had two children, actress Julie Cobb, and son Vincent Cobb, before divorcing in 1952. Cobb's second marriage was to school teacher Mary Hirsch, with whom he also had two children. Cobb supported Progressive Party candidate Henry A. Wallace in the 1948 United States presidential election.

Death
Cobb died of a heart attack in February 11, 1976 in Woodland Hills, California at age 64, and was buried in Mount Sinai Memorial Park Cemetery in Los Angeles.

He was inducted into the American Theatre Hall of Fame in 1981.

Filmography

Film

Television

Stage roles

Radio appearances

Accolades

Awards and nominations

Honors 
1966, Golden Plate Award of the American Academy of Achievement
1981, American Theatre Hall of Fame

See also
 McCarthyism
 Second Red Scare

References

External links

 
 
 

1911 births
1976 deaths
Actors Studio alumni
American male film actors
American male stage actors
New York University alumni
Donaldson Award winners
Male actors from New York City
Male Western (genre) film actors
United States Army Air Forces soldiers
American people of Romanian-Jewish descent
American people of Russian-Jewish descent
Jewish American male actors
First Motion Picture Unit personnel
Burials at Mount Sinai Memorial Park Cemetery
20th-century American male actors
20th-century American Jews
People from the Bronx
McCarthyism
United States Army Air Forces non-commissioned officers